The tropical rainforest tree Couepia longipendula is known by the common names egg nut, castanha de galinha, and pendula nut. It is found in the Amazon.

Its nuts are used as a food source in rural South America, especially in Brazil. The nuts are useful for their oil.

External links
Purdue Horticulture

Chrysobalanaceae
Trees of the Amazon
Trees of Brazil
Edible nuts and seeds